is a railway station on the Chūō Main Line in Nakano, Tokyo in Japan, operated jointly by East Japan Railway Company (JR East) and the Tokyo subway operator Tokyo Metro.

Lines
Nakano Station is served by the JR East Chuo Line (Rapid) and Chuo-Sobu Line, and the Tokyo Metro Tozai Line. There are no turnstiles between lines, allowing for easy transfers.

Station layout

The station consists of four island platforms serving eight tracks.

Platforms

Surrounding area

North side
 Nakano Ward office
 Nakano Sun Plaza, a major concert hall
 Sun Mall and Nakano Broadway, a shopping arcade famous as the home of Mandarake and for used record shops, collectibles, and other items
 Marui Department Store Headquarters

South side
 Nakano Zero, a cultural hall for concerts and exhibitions
 Nakano Public Library

History
Nakano Station opened on 11 April 1889.
The Tōzai Subway Line began operating from Nakano Station from 16 March 1966.

Passenger statistics
In fiscal 2017, the JR East station was used by 148,789 passengers daily (boarding passengers only), making it the 21st-busiest station operated by JR East. In fiscal 2013, the Tokyo Metro station was used by an average of 143,802 passengers per day (exiting and entering passengers). Note that the statistics consider passengers who travel through Nakano station on a through service as users of the station, even if they did not disembark at the station. The daily passenger figures for each operator in previous years are as shown below.

 Note that JR East figures are for boarding passengers only.

See also

 List of railway stations in Japan

References

External links

 JR East Nakano Station information 
 Tokyo Metro Nakano Station information 

Stations of East Japan Railway Company
Railway stations in Tokyo
Tokyo Metro Tozai Line
Nakano, Tokyo
Railway stations in Japan opened in 1889